Giacomo Antonio Corbellini (born 1674, Lugano or Laino — d. 1742, Laffio) was an Italian Baroque stuccoist noted for his work in the modern Czech Republic, in the domains of the House of Dietrichstein, and at Ludwigsburg Palace in Germany.

Biography
Giacomo Antonio Corbellini was born in 1674, either in Lugano or Laino, near Como.

Corbellini began working in southern Moravia for the House of Dietrichstein at the garden of Mikulov Castle. Three years later, while still working at Mikulov Castle, Corbellini was tasked with decorating its chapel in stucco. Corbellini was again working in Libochovice, this time at its castle, repairing stucco ceilings, in 1707.

In 1711, Corbellini moved to Prague, where he named his first son, Paolo.

After a few years in Prague, where he has no recorded works, Corbellini moved to and lived in Osek from 1713 to 1718. There, he produced for  its stuccoed altar and decor.

In 1718, Corbellini moved to Ludwigsburg, then capital of the Duchy of Württemberg, where his brother-in-law, Donato Giuseppe Frisoni, worked as chief architect on a new ducal palace. At Ludwigsburg Corbellini was tasked with the production of scagliola.

Corbellini returned to Italy in 1733 to live at Laffio, where he died in 1742.

Citations

References
 

1674 births
1742 deaths
People from Como
Italian people in arts occupations
Plasterers